Johnny Castellanos (born 24 December 1957) is a Venezuelan former footballer. He played in three matches for the Venezuela national football team from 1979 to 1983. He was also part of Venezuela's squad for the 1979 Copa América tournament.

References

1957 births
Living people
Venezuelan footballers
Venezuela international footballers
Place of birth missing (living people)
Association football defenders
Portuguesa F.C. players
A.C.C.D. Mineros de Guayana players